Warren Williams Sanders  (August 2, 1877 – August 3, 1962) was a professional baseball player who played pitcher in the Major Leagues in 1903 and 1904 for the St. Louis Cardinals. He went to college at the University of Tennessee.

External links

1877 births
1962 deaths
People from Maynardville, Tennessee
Major League Baseball pitchers
St. Louis Cardinals players
Baseball players from Tennessee
Minor league baseball managers
Indianapolis Hoosiers (minor league) players
Decatur Commodores players
Nashville Vols players
Omaha Indians players
Omaha Rangers players
Omaha Rourkes players
Charleston Sea Gulls players
Newnan Cowetas players